The Mayor of Bratislava is the highest political representative of the Slovak capital Bratislava. The Mayor's office is located in the Primate's Palace. Since 2018 the office has been held by Matúš Vallo, an architect.

List of mayors of Bratislava

Richtári of Pressburg (1280–1879)

1280 – Jacobus
1287 – Tirwardus
1288 – Jacobus
1302 – Hertlin
1314 – Hertlo
1324 – Bernhardus
1347 – Jacobus
1348 – Comes Jacobus
1352 – Jacus
1356 – Comes Jacus
1357 – Jacobus
1361 – Jacobus fil. Nikolai
1365 – Comes Jacobus
1371 – Jacob fil. Nikolai
1375 – Stephanus a Henricus
1377 – Henricus
1379 – Paul Spitzer
1389 – Mert Kirchenknopf together with Paul Spitzer
1390 – Nicolaus Plichendechel
1391 – Paul Spitzer
1396 – Paul Spitzer together with Ulrich Rauchwarter
1400 – Bernhardt Scharrach
1401 – Ulrich Rauchenwarter
1412 – Konrad Kitzmägl together with Peter Liszt
1413 – Wenig Gillig
1414 – Johannes Eilausenrock
1415 – Johannes Eilausenrock together with Andreas Treletsch
1419 – Andreas Pernhaitl
1423 – Johannes Eilausenrock
1424 – Konrad Kitzmagen
1427 – Johann Pauer
1428 – Johann Pauer together with Andreas Pernhaitl
1430 – Johann Pauer
1432 – Johannes Eilausenrock
1433 – Bartholomäus Scharrach
1435 – Stefan List
1437 – Stefan Ranes
1441 – Hans Eilausenrock
1442 – Ludwig Kunigsfelder
1444 – Ludwig Kunigsfelder together with Stephan List
1445 – Stefan Ranes
1447 – Ludwig Kunigsfelder
1450 – Peter Jungetl together with Ludwig Kunigsfelder
1453 – Stefan Gmaitl
1458 – Stefan Gmaitl together with Wenzel Bernhaitl
1461 – Ludwig Kunigsfelder
1465 – Stefan Gmaitl
1466 – Stefan Ranes
1467 – Ludwig Kunigsfelder
1469 – Stefan Ranes
1470 – Hans Pottenberger
1473 – Hans Karner
1475 – Johann Pottenberger
1477 – Hans Karner
1478 – Andreas Holtzer
1481 – Georg Schönperg
1484 – Andreas Holtzer
1491 – Martin Rosentaler
1494 – Peter Kraitz together with Jakob Aigner
1499 – Peter Kraitz together with Jakob Aigner together with Jakob Pellifex
1500 – Wolfgang Forster
1502 – Mathias Paier
1503 – Wolfgang Thailenkas
1506 – Wolfgang Forster
1508 – Johann Lachenperger
1509 – Wolfgang Forster
1510 – Johann Lachenperger
1513 – Michael Maixner
1517 – Caspar Leupold
1519 – Wolfgang Forster
1523 – Caspar Leupold
1524 – Michael Fischer
1531 – Michael Klee
1538 – Blasius Beham
1545 – Johann Berghammer
1547 – Blasius Beham
1550 – Thomas Reichenthaler
1552 – Johann Fischer
1555 – Michael Klee
1556 – Johann Fischer
1557 – Martin Aichinger
1559 – Johann Fischer
1560 – Caspar Hainrich
1561 – Wolfgang Kögl
1563 – Johann Fischer
1564 – Sigismund Luettenperger
1566 – Wolfgang Kögl
1567 – Johann Fischer
1568 – Wolfgang Kögl
1569 – Sigismud Luettenperger
1571 – Johann Fischer
1572 – Caspar Lichtenberger
1574 – Vitus Knap
1576 -  Mathias Aichinger
1577 – Georg Eisenreich
1581 – Vitus Knap
1583 – Georg Eisenreich
1584 – Caspar Lichtenberger
1585 – Lukas Maurach
1587 – Felician Schmugger
1589 – Zacharius Götzl
1592 – Mathias Partinger
1596 – Zacharius Götzl
1599 – Christof Tschatter
1601 – Martin Schödl
1603 – Johann Offner
1608 – Christof Tschatter
1610 – Martin Schödl
1611 – Rudolf Maurach
1613 – Johann Offner
1615 – Johann Hertl
1618 – Johann Schödl
1621 – Johann Hartl
1627 – Christof Partinger
1631 - Michael Moniz
1635 – Michael Földessy
1637 – Michael Jakob Szeleczky
1640 – Johannes Cellarius
1643 – Georg Tallyán
1646 – Andreas Segner
1648 – Jakob Prein
1649 – Gregor Tallyán
1651 – Martin Schödl
1653 – Gregor Tallyán
1656 – Mathias Tutzenzhaler
1658 – Andreas Segner
1660 – Georg Liebhart
1662 – Andreas Segner
1664 – Gregor Tallyán
1666 – Christoph Spindler
1668 – Gregor Tallyán
1669 – Andreas Baán
1670 – Thobias Plankenauer
1673 – Benedikt Pakay
1675 – Stefan Battay
1677 – Georg Hilscher
1678 – Georgius de Somogy
1680 – Michael Sambokréty
1684 – Georg Somogy
1687 – Michael Sambokréty
1689 – Nikolaus Straus
1692 – Josef Segner
1694 – Michael Sambokréty
1696 – Christof Burgstaller
1698 – Christof Spindler
1700 – Jakob Segner
1702 – Michael Sambokréty
1707 – Christof Burgstaller
1710 – Paul Kögl
1714 – Christof Burgstaller
1716 – Stefan Gostlony
1718 – Christof Burgstaller
1721 – Nikolaus Szenthe
1723 – Gabriel Skaricza
1724 – Michael Miklos
1726 – Johann Trummer
1728 – Christof Burgstaller
1730 – Johann Trummer
1732 – Michael Miklos
1733 – Christof Burgstaller
1734 – Emerich Csiba
1736 – Andreas Segner
1738 – Georg Kubótzy
1740 – Christof Burgstaller
1742 – Georg Kubótzy
1744 – Christof Málik
1746 – Christoph Veingruber
1748 – Andreas Segner
1750 – Georg Kubótzy
1751 – Franciscus Nozdrovitzky
1752 – Christof Málik
1754 – Franciscus Nozdrovitzky
1756 – Andreas Segner
1757 – Christof Málik
1758 – Franciscus Nozdrovitzky
1760 – Michael Gombos
1762 – Carol. Kegly together with Stephan Várady
1764 - Stephan Várady
1766 – Michael Gombos
1768 – Alex. Kevitzky
1770 – Carol. Vilh. Málik
1772 – Alex. Kevitzky
1774 – Michael Gombos
1776 – Alex. Kevitzky
1778 – Emer. Mikoviny
1784 – Josef Stettner
1788 – Georg. Kajdacsy
1790 – Joan. Vallovics
1793 – Joan. Stettner
1798 – Josef Kálna
1801 – Josef Karner
1803 – Josef Kálna
1806 – Josef Schmidt
1808 – Josef Sánta
1810 – Georg. Albrecht
1812 – Petrus Mottko
1815 – Paulus Kochmeister
1818 – Petrus Mottko
1821 – Jonas Kettner
1824 – Carolus Jäger
1827 – Jonas Kettner
1830 – Carolus Jäger
1839 – Josef Bajcsy
1861 – Ernest Hauszer (until November 21, 1861), then Mathias Dobrovits
1862 – Mathias Dobrovits
1867 - Henrich Justi
1879 – Mór Gottl

After 1879 the title of richtár (lat. judex, eng. mayor) is replaced by mešťanosta (lat. consules).

Mešťanostovia of Pressburg/Bratislava (1884–1945)

1884 – Mór Gottl (until April 9, 1884), then Carolus Mergl
1889 – Gustav Dröxler
1898 – Paulus Taller
1900 – Tivadar Brolly
1918 – Tóder Kumlik
1919 – Richard Kánya
1920 – Dr. Viktor Duschek
1922 – Dr. Emerich Zimmer
1923 – Dr. Ľudovít Okánik (1929 resigned)
1930 – Dr. Vladimír Krno (until 1933)
1939 – Dr. Belo Kováč
1944 – Dr. Belo Kováč (until May 3, 1944), then Dr. Štefan Ravasz
1945 – Dr. Štefan Ravasz (until April 6, 1945)
1945 – Prof. Dr. Karol Koch (until April 8, 1945) (predseda NV)
1945 – Štefan Bašťovanský (until April 10, 1945) (predseda NV)
1945 – Dr. Štefan Ravasz gives his office of mešťanosta to the Predsedníctvo NV. The office is renamed primátor in Slovak.

Primátori of Bratislava (1946—present)
 1946 – Dr. Anton Vasek (until October 4, 1946), then Dr. Josef Kyselý
 1948 – Dr. Josef Kyselý (until February 20, 1948) then Dr. Martin Kuban (until February 27, 1948), then Dr. Anton Vasek
 1950 – 1952 – Ladislav Kurták
 1952 – 1954 – Ján Šrámek
 1954 – Ján Šrámek (until May 16, 1954), then František Čáp (1954 – 1957)
 1957 – František Čáp (until May 19, 1957), then Ján Šebík (1957 – 1961)
 1961 – 1964 – Pavol Tomáš
 1964 – 1969 – Ing. arch. Milan Hladký
 1969 – Ing. arch. Milan Hladký (until February 26, 1969), then Štefan Jardanházy (until December 12, 1969), then Ing. Ladislav Martinák
 1970 – 1986 – Ing. Ladislav Martinák
 1986 – 1990 – Ing. Štefan Barták
 1990 – Ing. Štefan Barták (until March 1, 1990), then Ing. Roman Hofbauer (until December 10, 1990), then Mgr. Peter Kresánek
 1990 – 1998 – Mgr. Peter Kresánek
 1998 – 2002 – JUDr. Jozef Moravčík
 2002 – 2010 – Ing. Andrej Ďurkovský
 2010 – 2014 – Doc. RNDr. Milan Ftáčnik, CSc.
 2014 – 2018 – JUDr. Ivo Nesrovnal, LL.M.
 2018 – present – Ing. arch. Matúš Vallo

References

Sources
 List of Mayors of Bratislava from the official city homepage in Slovak
 List of Mayors of Bratislava in Slovak

External links
 Official page of the sitting Mayor of Bratislava from Archive.org

 
Lists of political office-holders in Slovakia
Politics of Bratislava